Phool Khile Hain Gulshan Gulshan may refer to:

 Phool Khile Hain Gulshan Gulshan (film) - a Hindi movie made in 1978
 Phool Khile Hain Gulshan Gulshan (TV show) - a Hindi TV show on Doordarshan featuring Tabassum interviewing famous film and TV personalities which aired for 21 years and was the 1st Bollywood show from 1972 to 1993.